James L. O'Connor (June 3, 1859August 19, 1931) was an American lawyer and Democratic politician.  He was the 15th Attorney General of Wisconsin (1891–1895).

Biography

Born in Hartford, Wisconsin, O'Connor graduated from University of Wisconsin Law School. He served as city attorney for Madison, Wisconsin, and then district attorney of Dane County, Wisconsin. After serving as Wisconsin Attorney General, O'Connor moved to Milwaukee, Wisconsin, where he continued to practice law.

Electoral history

| colspan="6" style="text-align:center;background-color: #e9e9e9;"| General Election, November 4, 1890

| colspan="6" style="text-align:center;background-color: #e9e9e9;"| General Election, November 8, 1892

| colspan="6" style="text-align:center;background-color: #e9e9e9;"| General Election, November 6, 1894

References

Wisconsin Attorneys General
District attorneys in Wisconsin
University of Wisconsin Law School alumni
1858 births
1931 deaths